Silva Smedberg (10 July 1891 – 22 August 1967) was a Danish rowing coxswain. He competed in the men's coxed four event at the 1912 Summer Olympics.

References

1891 births
1967 deaths
Danish male rowers
Olympic rowers of Denmark
Rowers at the 1912 Summer Olympics
Rowers from Copenhagen
Coxswains (rowing)